The Alexandria Metro is a proposed rapid transit system for Egypt's second largest city, Alexandria. It will be Egypt's second metro system after the Cairo Metro.

Background
In March 2017, The National Authority for Tunnels (NAT) was reported to have received a Japanese offer to implement a new metro line in Egypt’s Mediterranean city of Alexandria from Masr station to New Borg El Arab.

In 2019, the Governor of Alexandria, Abdul Aziz Qansua, announced that the construction of the Alexandria Metro will begin in either late 2019 or first quarter of 2020, at a cost of $1.05–1.5 billion. It will be implemented over two years in three phases.

Network
The first phase will upgrade the existing railway line from Abu Qir in the northeastern part of the city to Misr Station in the historic center of Alexandria, 21.7 km in length with 20 stations, including 5 new stations, paralleling the Mediterranean coast, the Corniche and the preexisting Raml lines of the Alexandria Tram. The second phase will start from Misr station to El Max in the southwestern part of the city, again paralleling the coastline. Finally the third stage will extend inland from the Max station to Alkyl and then  to the Cairo–Alexandria desert road. The network is expected to serve 10,000 to 15,000 commuters an hour.

See also
 Rail transport in Egypt
 Trams in Alexandria

References

Rapid transit in Egypt
Electric railways in Egypt
Rail transport in Egypt
Transport in Alexandria
Proposed rapid transit